Vršíček ( above sea level) is a hill in the Švihov Highlands in the Czech Republic.

Buildings
On the summit of Vršíček there is a baroque Chapel of the Visitation of the Virgin Mary, which was built in 1744–47. The construction of the chapel was funded by town of Rokycany and was intended as a thank for protection from the plague epidemics in 1680, 1689 and 1713.

References

Mountains and hills of the Czech Republic
Baroque architecture in the Czech Republic
Chapels in the Czech Republic
Rokycany District